Kalyana-Karnataka is a region of the Indian state of Karnataka, which was part of Kingdom of Hyderabad ruled by the Nizams and the Madras presidency of British India. The region comprises Bidar, Yadgir, Raichur, Koppal and Kalaburagi of Hyderabad state and, Ballari and Vijayanagara of the Madras province that are now present in the state of Karnataka. The Northeast-Karnataka region is the second largest arid region in India. Kalaburagi and Ballari are the largest cities of this region.

In 1948, when the Hyderabad State was officially merged into India, some portions of it were incorporated into the state of Karnataka.

In 2019, the Hyderabad-Karnataka region was officially renamed as Kalyana-Karnataka.

See also
Mysore (region)
North Karnataka
Nizam of Hyderabad
Asaf Jahi dynasty

References

Regions of India
Regions of Karnataka
Hyderabad State